14871 Pyramus, provisional designation , is a dark Zhongguo asteroid from the outermost region of the asteroid belt, approximately  in diameter. It was discovered on 13 October 1990 by German astronomers Lutz Schmadel and Freimut Börngen at the Karl Schwarzschild Observatory in Tautenburg, Germany. The asteroid was named for Pyramus from classical mythology.

Orbit and classification 

Pyramus is a non-family asteroid from the main belt's background population. It is a member of the small group of Zhongguo asteroids, located in the 2 : 1 mean motion resonance with the giant planet Jupiter. Contrary to the nearby unstable Griqua group, the orbits of the Zhongguos are stable over half a billion years.

It orbits the Sun in the outer main-belt at a distance of 2.6–4.0 AU once every 6.00 years (2,192 days; semi-major axis of 3.3 AU). Its orbit has an eccentricity of 0.22 and an inclination of 1° with respect to the ecliptic. The first precovery was taken at Palomar Observatory in 1954, extending the asteroid's observation arc by 36 years prior to its discovery.

Physical characteristics

Diameter and albedo 

According to the survey carried out by NASA's Wide-field Infrared Survey Explorer with its subsequent NEOWISE mission, Pyramus measures 9.2 kilometers in diameter and its surface has an albedo of 0.069. This is in line with a generic absolute magnitude-to-diameter conversion that gives a diameter of 4 to 9 kilometers for an albedo between 0.05 and 0.25.

Lightcurves 

As of 2018, no rotational lightcurve has been obtained of Pyramus. The asteroid's rotation period, pole and shape remain unknown.

Naming 

This minor planet was named from Greco-Roman mythology after Pyramus, the lover of Thisbe (see minor planet 88 Thisbe) from which the tragedy of Romeo and Juliet ultimately originated. As narrated in Ovid's Metamorphoses, the two ill-fated lovers committed suicide as their parents were against their marriage. The asteroid's name was proposed by Austrian amateur astronomer Herbert Raab. The citation mentions that the "two lovers are now finally united forever in the asteroid belt". The approved naming citation was published by the Minor Planet Center on 6 January 2003.

References

External links 
 (14871) Pyramus  at AstDyS, University of Pisa
 Erratum: Asteroids in the 2 : 1 resonance with Jupiter: dynamics and size distribution
 Asteroid Lightcurve Database (LCDB), query form (info )
 Dictionary of Minor Planet Names, Google books
 Asteroids and comets rotation curves, CdR – Observatoire de Genève, Raoul Behrend
 Discovery Circumstances: Numbered Minor Planets (10001)-(15000) – Minor Planet Center
 
 

014871
014871
Discoveries by Lutz D. Schmadel
Discoveries by Freimut Börngen
Named minor planets
19901013